Ferdinando Stanhope (1619 to December 1643), younger son of Philip Stanhope, 1st Earl of Chesterfield, was Member of Parliament for Tamworth from 1640 to 1643. He served in the Royalist army during the First English Civil War and was killed in a skirmish near West Bridgford.

Personal details

Stanhope was born at Shelford Manor, Nottinghamshire; his date of birth is uncertain but must have been around 1618 in order to meet the minimum age of 21 when elected to Parliament in 1640. He was the ninth but fourth surviving son of Philip Stanhope, 1st Earl of Chesterfield and his wife Catherine, daughter of Francis Hastings, Lord Hastings.

Shortly before his death in 1643, he married Lettice Ferrers, daughter of Sir Humphrey Ferrers of Tamworth Castle, and left a posthumous daughter Anne.

Career
In November 1640, Stanhope was elected Member of Parliament for Tamworth in the Long Parliament. When the First English Civil War began in August 1642, he joined the Royalist and fought in the Edgehill campaign. In early 1643, he was one of a group of officers created M.A. of the University of Oxford by Charles I.

Promoted colonel of a cavalry regiment which fought at Lichfield and Hopton Heath in April 1643, he was killed in December in a skirmish near West Bridgford. He was later buried in the family plot at St Peter and St Paul churchyard.

His cousin Sir Aston Cokain wrote him an epitaph:

Ancestry

References

Sources
 
 
 
 
 

1610s births
1643 deaths
Cavaliers
English military personnel killed in action
English MPs 1640–1648
Younger sons of earls
Ferdinando
People killed in the English Civil War
Royalist military personnel of the English Civil War
Military personnel from Nottinghamshire